The New England New State Movement was an Australian political movement in the twentieth century. Founded as the Northern Separation Movement, the aim of the movement was to seek the secession of the New England region and surrounding areas from the State of New South Wales (NSW) and the establishment of a new State of New England. While popular at first and the subject of two Royal Commissions, the movement was unsuccessful, and was defeated at a referendum in 1967.

Geographical description

Because New England has never had a formal identity, its claimed boundaries have varied with time. In broad terms, it covers the humid coastal strip including the Hunter Region to the Queensland border, the New England Tablelands and the immediately adjoining Western Slopes and Plains.

In economic and geographic terms, New England forms a natural unit that has survived to the present day.

In political terms, the boundaries have varied. The initial separation discussions excluded the Hunter, in part because of tensions between the industrial and mining heartland of the lower Hunter and the rest of the area. This created a problem because an urban/industrial centre like Newcastle and the Hunter were seen as an essential part of New England, or any new state, in economic and geographic terms. The boundaries recommended by the 1935 report of the Nicholas Royal Commission into areas of NSW suitable for self-government included Newcastle and the Hunter. These boundaries were adopted by the New England New State Movement and used as the basis for the 1967 self-government referendum.

Name
New England was first called Northern NSW, the North, the Northern Districts or the Northern Provinces. The name New England was applied to the Tableland area forming New England's core. The Tablelands are known as the Northern Tablelands, the New New England Tablelands or sometimes just the New England to distinguish them from the broader New England area.

The name New England was adopted for the whole area by the Northern Separation Movement at its 1931 Maitland convention. From there its usage spread, contracting again as the new state movement went into decline after 1967.

Philosophical origins 
From its earliest days, separatism was associated with the then newly-formed Country Party, and its immediate predecessor the Progressive Party. The rationale for a separate state had parallels with that of the Country Party itself, a belief that country interests needed to be defended against dominant metropolitan interests, particularly, but not only, those associated with the Australian Labor Party. Within the area proposed for the new state—especially if the industrial and mining area of the Lower Hunter were to be excluded—the Country Party stood a far better chance of forming a majority government, something politically impossible within the existing larger state of New South Wales. The Country Party's influence at federal level would also tend to increase, by the creation of new senators representing the new state. 

The demographics of the area of the proposed new state area were also significant. Compared to the metropolitan and southern parts of New South Wales, the Northern Tablelands and Northern Rivers had a higher concentration of followers of the then-dominant Protestant religions, had noticeably more people of Scottish descent, and was markedly less Catholic. The choice of a lion rampant, highly-reminiscent of the Royal Banner of Scotland, as the movement's flag suggests that, at least in the movement's earlier years, an element of sectarianism, as well as separatism, may have been involved.

New state agitation

The first separatist agitation occurred during colonial times at the time of the separation of Queensland from NSW. While this was followed by outbreaks of agitation, these remained sporadic.

This changed in the twentieth century. Agitation began again at Grafton towards the end of the First World War led by Earle Page, a local doctor and later a prominent politician, rising to caretaker Prime Minister of Australia. This was picked up a little later by Victor Thompson, editor of the Tamworth Northern Daily Leader who launched a sustained newspaper campaign that involved papers as far south as Cessnock in the lower Hunter. This led to the creation of a formal movement. In 1922 a formal request to the Commonwealth was made by the lower house to establish a new state in northern New South Wales. One outcome was the 1924 Cohen Royal Commission into New States.

The Cohen Commission ruled against to the movement and it went into decline, resurging at the start of the Great Depression. This forced another Royal Commission, the Nicholas Commission. While this recommended in favour, the movement was again in decline as economic conditions improved.

Agitation started again at the end of the Second World War and this time was sustained by permanent staff. In 1953, 21 councils defied the state government and held unofficial referendum on the issue of a new state. The people voted overwhelmingly in favour of the referendum. In 1961 the movement launched Operation Seventh State, raising over AU£100,000. This allowed more staff and greater agitation.

This acceptance of boundaries determined by the Nicholas Commission proved to be the movement's critical strategic error. It assumed that a state was not viable unless it was dominated by a large urban population on the English/London model. Yet, the evidence from similar federations like Canada and the USA revealed numerous successful "farm states", like Wyoming, Montana and the Dakotas, with comparatively small capital city populations tied to a single, essentially rural community of interest. This metrocentric mindset ensured that two quite distinct communities of interest were being pressured into a doomed arranged marriage. It was also the very antithesis of an "act of free choice" as that choice involved imposing a majority rural will over a geographically distinct urban community. A new state proposal based in most part on boundaries formed by those Local Councils with majorities that actually wanted the change would have acquired a critical momentum.

Premier Robert Askin and the Cabinet believed in 1966 that a secession referendum would win, so they had the upper Hunter Region and Newcastle included within the boundaries of the proposed new state before putting it to a vote.

Referendum

A referendum of New England electors was held on 29 April 1967. The 'no' vote was led by the Australian Labor Party who campaigned hard. The referendum was narrowly defeated with 54% voting 'no'. The very high 'no' vote in the Labor strongholds of Newcastle and the Lower Hunter offset the majority 'yes' vote elsewhere, although the no margin was not high. The threat of restricted access to the highly regulated Sydney milk and dairy products market also boosted the 'no' vote in rural areas.

Despite this defeat, four New State candidates stood for election at the 1968 state election and gained 0.80% of the total state vote with Garry Nehl, in the seat of Clarence, winning 35% of the primary vote. However this was a brief twilight in the campaign and, exhausted, the movement again went into decline for the next four decades.

Practical consequences 
Although the question of the new state's capital remained open, Armidale, was both a centre of the movement and location of its conferences, and it was also the putative capital city. It was also already a cathedral city for Anglicans and Catholics, and location of a number of religious secondary schools.

Supporters of the new state movement used their influence, to obtain amenities and infrastructure that would be appropriate for a new state and its capital city, using a policy of decentralisation as a justification. When a new power station opened at Armidale in 1922, it was under the Scottish royal banner, later, in modified form, the symbol of the New State Movement. A firm supporter of the movement, Armidale's parliamentary representative and Minister of Education, Mr D. H. Drummond, selected Armidale, as the site of the second teacher's college in New South Wales in 1929. The presence of secondary schools and the teachers' college in Armidale was a factor in the foundation, in 1938, of the New England University College that was the predecessor of the University of New England. D. H. Drummond was also a prominent advocate for the University College, which was established after a donation of land and donations of funds to enfrom the community.

21st century revival

The movement underwent a resurgence in 2004, primarily in response to State (Labor) Government shire amalgamations and farmers responses to new vegetation management policies. The Annual General Meetings of NSW Farmers passed resolutions to investigate the feasibility of a non-metropolitan state in both 2004 and 2005. A task force was formed chaired by then NSWF President Mr Malcolm Peters. Some polling was commissioned and a convention was held but little further effort appears to have taken place.

A group of dedicated activists continue to agitate for a new state in the area. It is being carried out in an informal sense or through social media such as a dedicated Facebook page.

See also
 Proposals for new Australian States

References

Bibliography

External links
 New England New State Movement on Facebook

New England (New South Wales)
Proposed states and territories of Australia
History of New South Wales
20th century in New South Wales
1960s in New South Wales